Lily Postlethwaite (born 29 October 2001) is an Australian rules footballer playing for Brisbane in the AFL Women's competition (AFLW).

Early and state football
Postlethwaite started her sporting career playing Oztag, the Australian variation of tag rugby, and started playing Australian rules football only at the age of 12. In 2014 she won the most valuable player award for Oztag's 13 Girls Division. Postlethwaite played for Moreton Bay Lions and won the under-15 division best and fairest in 2016. Postlethwaite played for Maroochydore in the AFL Queensland Women's League (QWAFL). In the 2019 season she won the QWAFL Rising Star Award. During 2019, Postlethwaite also played for the Brisbane Lions Academy team. Postlethwaite represented Queensland in the AFL Women's Under 18 Championships. In the 2018 AFL Women's Under 18 Championships, she was selected for the All-Australian team. In the 2019 AFL Women's Under 18 Championships she led the team as captain and was selected once again for the All-Australian team.

AFLW career
Postlethwaite was drafted by Brisbane with the third pick in the 2019 AFL Women's draft. She made her debut in Brisbane's opening round game against Adelaide at Hickey Park on 8 February 2020.

Personal life
Postlethwaite is from Caboolture in Queensland and grew up supporting Brisbane Lions. She grew up on a farm and used the horse track for some unorthodox training and conditioning while at home.

References

External links
 

2001 births
Living people
Sportswomen from Queensland
Australian rules footballers from Queensland
Brisbane Lions (AFLW) players